Wendy Chen Hsuan-yu (born 1 June 1993) is an Australian badminton player who has represented her country at the 2016 Rio and 2020 Tokyo Olympic Games.

Career 
Badminton was the family sport and all of Chen's family played. She excelled in her high school years and represented her school in both junior and senior Badminton events. She then turned professional and made her International debut for badminton in 2012. 

At the 2016 Rio Olympics, Chen made her Olympic debut representing Australia. Her opponents were Thailand's Porntip Buranaprasertsuk and Mauritius' Kate Foo Kune and in spite of a good contest she lost to both.

In 2017, Chen won the Casa Del Sole Noumea International. In 2018, she represented Australia at the Commonwealth Games in Gold Coast, Australia. In early 2020, she won the women's singles titles at the Oceania Championships in six consecutive years from 2015–2020.

Chen played at the 2020 Tokyo Olympics, and was knocked out in the group stage after finishing second in her group.

Achievements

Oceania Championships 
Women's singles

Women's doubles

Mixed doubles

BWF International Challenge/Series (1 title, 6 runners-up) 
Women's singles

Women's doubles

  BWF International Challenge tournament
  BWF International Series tournament
  BWF Future Series tournament

References

External links 
 
 
 
 
 
 

1993 births
Living people
Sportspeople from Taichung
Taiwanese emigrants to Australia
Australian people of Taiwanese descent
Sportspeople from Brisbane
Sportswomen from Queensland
Australian female badminton players
Badminton players at the 2016 Summer Olympics
Badminton players at the 2020 Summer Olympics
Olympic badminton players of Australia
Badminton players at the 2018 Commonwealth Games
Badminton players at the 2022 Commonwealth Games
Commonwealth Games competitors for Australia
People educated at Brisbane State High School
20th-century Australian women
21st-century Australian women